The 20th edition of the Vuelta Ciclista de Chile was held from March 19 to March 29, 1997.

Stages

Final classification

References
cyclingnews

Vuelta Ciclista de Chile
Chile
Vuelta Ciclista
March 1997 sports events in South America